This is a list of the 62 National Register of Historic Places listings in Evanston, Illinois.

Current listings

|}

References

Evanston, Illinois
 
Evanston
Evanston, Illinois